This is a recap of the 1996 season for the Professional Bowlers Association (PBA) Tour.  It was the tour's 38th season, and consisted of 29 events.

Dave D'Entremont won his first career major at the Brunswick World Tournament of Champions. Likewise, long-time PBA Tour professional Butch Soper captured his first career major at the PBA National Championship.

Dave Husted became the first PBA player to win three modern-day BPAA U.S. Open titles, and the first to win back-to-back as he successfully defended his 1995 U.S. Open crown.

Though shut out in the major tournaments, Walter Ray Williams, Jr. collected five titles on the season and led the tour in earnings, helping him win PBA Player of the Year honors for the third time in his career.

At the Columbia 300 Open, C.K. Moore rolled the PBA's ninth televised 300 game, becoming the first Tour rookie to do so. Later in the season, at the Flagship Open, Bob Learn, Jr. rolled the PBA's 10th televised perfect game in his hometown of Erie, Pennsylvania. At this same event, Learn shattered the PBA record for a four-game TV series by downing 1,129 pins. The old record was set in 1995 by David Ozio, who toppled 1,070 pins.

Tournament schedule

References

External links
1996 Season Schedule

Professional Bowlers Association seasons
1996 in bowling